The Clinical Journal of the American Society of Nephrology is a monthly peer-reviewed medical journal covering nephrology. It was established in 2006 and is published by the American Society of Nephrology. The editor-in-chief is Rajnish Mehrotra (University of Washington). According to the Journal Citation Reports, the journal has a 2020 impact factor of 8.237, ranking it 4th out of 80 journals in the category "Urology & Nephrology".

Abstracting and indexing
The journal is abstracted and indexed in the following databases:

References

External links

Nephrology journals
Academic journals published by learned and professional societies of the United States
Publications established in 2006
Monthly journals
English-language journals